Stadionul Someșul is a multi-use stadium in Satu Mare, Romania. It is used mostly for football matches and is the home ground of Someșul Satu Mare and Olimpia Satu Mare. The stadium holds 6,000 people.

References

External links
 Stadionul Someșul at soccerway.com

Football venues in Romania
Buildings and structures in Satu Mare County
Buildings and structures in Satu Mare